Adolf Gustav Seefeldt (March 6, 1870 – May 23, 1936), known as The Sandman, was a German serial killer.

Life

Early life 
Born as the seventh and last child of his parents, Adolf was first trained as a locksmith then as a watchmaker who repaired grandfather clocks and pocket watches. He came to Lübeck in 1890 and married Katarina Seefeldt, who divorced him in 1910. His son was sent to a lunatic asylum for moral crimes, at the age of nineteen.

Seefeldt is said to have been abused by two men at the age of 12. He was first imprisoned at 25 years for sexual harassment of a boy. Psychiatrists diagnosed him as mentally unstable, which is why he spent most of his life in mental hospitals and prisons.

Serial murders 
The traveler and watchmaker Adolf Seefeldt, also called "Sandman" or – because of his profession – "Uncle Tick Tock" and "Uncle Adi", abused and killed at least twelve boys during the reign of the Third Reich. As a crime scene he usually chose pine preservations with one exception. A commonality was found in the victim's clothing, who consistently wore sailor suits. Since all children were "sleeping peacefully" and showed no signs of external violence, the police were mystified by the circumstances of death. It is therefore possible that Seefeldt committed more murders that were considered natural deaths.

Contemporary experts speculated that Seefeldt had used his own homemade poison, chloroform or smothered his victims. According to Hans Pfeiffer, a well-known author of popular science books on authentic criminal cases, these theories were disproven with little effort. Pfeiffer suspected, however, that Seefeldt had put his victims into a hypnotic sleep, then probably performed oral sex on them and let them lie asleep in the woods, where he failed to awaken them from hypnosis. The children later died of hypothermia, which Seefeldt had accepted or intended.

The victims 
His victims ranged from toddlers to 12-year-old boys: Kurt Gnirk (April 16, 1933), Wolfgang Metzdorf (October 8, 1933), Ernst Tesdorf (November 2, 1933), Alfred Prätorius (November 12, 1933), Hans Korn (January 16, 1934), Günter Tieske from Oranienburg (October 2, 1934), 11-year-old Erwin Wishnewski from Brandenburg (October 8, 1934), 4-year-old Artur Dill and 5-year-old Edgar "Eipel" Dittrich (October 16, 1934, both found in Neuruppin), 10-year-old Hans-Joachim Neumann (killed February 16, 1935; found on June 20, 1935), 10-year-old Heinz Zimmerman (February 23, 1935) and 11-year-old Gustav Thomas (March 22, 1935). The investigative authorities assumed that the actual number of casualties was much higher, possibly claiming up to 100 lives.

Gustav Thomas case 
The lawyer Wilhelm Hallermann summed the murder case of 11-year-old Gustav Thomas (found in a pine forest near Wittenberge), that due to microscopic examinations, the bloodshot pressure indicated strangulation.

The medical examiner Victor Müller-Heß came in the murder trial against Seefeldt with the claim that the murder victims were not poisoned, but instead strangled.

Trial and execution 
The Schwerin jury under the chairmanship of the district court director Karl Friedrich Sarkander and the advisory district court councils of Wilms and Weise consisted of butcher Ernst Hahn from Crivitz, secretary Wilhelm Schneeweis from Schwerin, Ortsgruppenleiter Friedrich Jahnke from Parchim, Mayor Ernst Dubbe from Leussow, engineer Otto Arpke from Lübtheen and city councilor Kreisleiter Buhr from Ludwigslust, negotiating the case on January 21, 1936. Chief prosecutor was Wilhelm Beusch, to whom Bishop Bernhard Schräder recalled in connection with the case of Vicar Leo Wiemker.

In the presence of later war criminal and Reichsstatthalter of Mecklenburg, Friedrich Hildebrandt, railed against the accused in order to justify the eradication of such behaviour. Adolf Seefeldt's defense lawyer was Rudolf Neudeck. August Brüning (1877–1965) was a participating expert in the trial.

After the closing arguments of February 21, the verdict for the murder cases was announced the following day. Seefeldt was sentenced to death. According to the Niederdeutschen Beobachter, on February 29, 1936, Seefeldt is to have brought in an appeal. Neither a revision nor a revision procedure is historically documented; the judgment was enforced after legal force and refusal of the pardon occurred on May 23, 1936.  The records of Seefeldt's conviction are poor. In addition to newspaper reports of his execution, there are only two memory protocols of conversations conducted in April 1936 at his cell in Schwerin. The case of Adolf Seefeldt was discussed by J. Fischer and Johannes Lange in the Monthly Journal of Forensic Biology and Penal Reform.

Execution 
Earlier, the executioner Carl Gröpler had visited him and "recognized the expected difficulty of the execution". Seefeldt was allegedly eager to be beheaded next morning by the guillotine.

See also
 List of German serial killers

References

Literature 
 Matthias Blazek: Executions in Prussia and the German Reich 1866–1945. ibidem-Verlag, Stuttgart 2010. 
 P. Böttger: Dogs in the service of the criminal police with special consideration of the Seefeldt murder case. Leipzig 1937
 Kerstin Brückweh: Mordlust – serial murders, violence and emotions in the 20th century. Campus Verlag, Frankfurt am Main 2006.  Auszugsweise online – Digitalisat
 Erich Ebermayer: „Uncle Tick Tack. The boy murderer Adolf Seefeldt“. In: Robert A. Stemmle [Hrsg.]: Sexual crime (The New Pitaval; Bd. 13). München [u. a.] 1967, p. 11–38
 Jens Haberland: „Adolf Seefeldt – an unsolved mystery“. In: ders.: Serial killers in the 20th century. Berlin 1997. , p. 125–129
 Hans Peiffer: „The Sandman – Adolf Seefeldt (1933–1935)“. In: Wolfgang Schüler [Hrsg.]: Serial murder in Germany. Leipzig 2005. . S. 16–36 (online (S. 146 ff.)), Retrieved on May 30, 2014
 Ulrich Zander: "The hunt for the 'Sandman'" The trial of serial killer Adolf Seefeldt began 80 years in Schwerin. Wandering clockmaker killed twelve boys. In: Schweriner Volkszeitung / Mecklenburg-Magazin (29. Januar 2016), p. 24.
 Frank-Rainer Schurich, Michael Stricker: The serial killer Adolf Seefeldt and modern criminals. Verlag Dr. Köster, Berlin 2015, 
 Frank-Rainer Schurich, Michael Stricker: The beast from the forest. Historical criminal case. Verlag Dr. Köster, Berlin 2015,

External links 
 Mysterious Murders: Adolf Seefeldt (www.planet-wissen.de)
 Splendor and misery of the German Criminal Police, The Mirror of November 24, 1949

1870 births
1936 deaths
1933 murders in Germany
1934 murders in Germany
1935 murders in Germany
1930s murders in Germany
Executed German serial killers
German clockmakers
German murderers of children
German people convicted of child sexual abuse
Male serial killers
People convicted of murder by Germany
People executed by Nazi Germany by guillotine
Violence against men in Europe